Baxter is an unincorporated community in Marion County, West Virginia, United States. Baxter lies to the northwest of Rivesville along Paw Paw Creek.

The town was once the site of the Stafford Mine, one of the largest bituminous coal mines in Marion County, owned by the New Central Coal Company of New York.

References 

Unincorporated communities in Marion County, West Virginia
Unincorporated communities in West Virginia
Coal towns in West Virginia